"Over Shine" is a song by Japanese singer-songwriter Rina Aiuchi. It was released on 30 July 2003 through Giza Studio, as the fifth single from her third studio album A.I.R.. The song reached number six in Japan and has sold over 46,206 copies nationwide. The song served as the theme song to the Japanese television shows, Yuji Miyake no Doshiroto and Ax Music-TV. The B-side track, "Code Crush" served as the opening theme song to the PlayStation 2 video game, Mega Man X7.

Track listing

Charts

Weekly charts

Certification and sales

|-
! scope="row"| Japan (RIAJ)
| 
| 46,206 
|-
|}

Release history

References

2003 singles
2003 songs
J-pop songs
Song recordings produced by Daiko Nagato
Songs written by Rina Aiuchi